The Revel General Store is a historic commercial building at the southwest corner of Arkansas Highway 260 and Woodruff County Road 17 in Revel, Arkansas.  It is a small single-story vernacular wood-frame structure, finished in its original weatherboard siding, and sporting a false parapet in front of a gabled roof.  Built in 1908, it is the only commercial building in the hamlet, served as its general store until about 1975.

The building was listed on the National Register of Historic Places in 2003.

See also
National Register of Historic Places listings in Woodruff County, Arkansas

References

Commercial buildings on the National Register of Historic Places in Arkansas
Commercial buildings completed in 1908
National Register of Historic Places in Woodruff County, Arkansas
1908 establishments in Arkansas
Western false front architecture
General stores in the United States